The Association of Naval Services Officers (ANSO) is an organization dedicated to expanding the presence of Hispanic and Latino Americans in the Sea Services of the United States Navy, the United States Marine Corps, the United States Coast Guard, and the United States Merchant Marine. The organization was established in 1981. ANSO connects and networks Hispanics in the Coast Guard, Marine Corps, and Navy together and supports recruitment and retention of officers in the Sea Services. Programs include mentoring, training, and education.

ANSO works particularly closely with the Navy to support the diversity goals of the Chief of Naval Operations of increasing the number of Hispanic active duty officers from 6 to 13 percent by 2037.

History
Recruiting Hispanics and preparing them for careers in the Navy was a special project of United States Secretary of the Navy Edward Hidalgo during the Carter administration from 1979-1981. Hidalgo began addressing recruitment options at the Hispanic Officer Recruitment Conference (HORC) in December 1980. As a result of this meeting, the Association of Naval Service Officers (ANSO) was created. ANSO was formally established in February 1981.

In the 1990s, ANSO National President CDR Raúl Castañeda, USN (1993-1996) expanded the mission of the organization from one of recruitment of Hispanics to one that also included training and networking. Castañeda also helped increase the number of members, doubling it in size.

Chapters
ANSO has chapters in various states which directly assist the Sea Services efforts in attracting Hispanics as naval officers, as well as retaining Hispanic officers through recruitment, mentoring and educational efforts. ANSO conducts an east and west regional professional development symposium each year which attracts high-level military leaders who assist in furthering the organization's goals.

ANSO Board of Directors
The board currently consists of 21 members (2012-2013).
 National President: CDR Blanca Rosas, USCG (Ret.)
 National Executive Vice-President: CDR Jose Rosario, USCG
 National Secretary: LCDR Yamaris Barril, USCG 
 Western Region Vice-President: CDR Jason Brand, USCG
 Eastern Region Vice-President: CAPT Milciades "Tony" Then, USN
 Navy Service Representative: LCDR Rolando J. Machado Jr., USN
 Marine Corps Service Representative:  Lt. Col. Jennifer Ballard, USMC
 Coast Guard Representative: LCDR Eric Driggs, USCGR

ANSO Board of Advisors

 Ray Mellado, CEO Great Minds in Stem, ANSO BoA Chairman

References

Further reading

United States military associations
1981 establishments in the United States
Hispanic and Latino American professional organizations